

Events calendar

+06